Comptus is a genus of diploglossid lizards native to the West Indies.

Taxonomy
All three species were previously classified in the genus Celestus.

Species 
There are three species in the genus, all of which are widely geographically separated from each other on different islands:
 Comptus badius  – Navassa galliwasp
 Comptus maculatus  – Cayman galliwasp
 Comptus stenurus  – Hispaniolan keeled galliwasp or Cope's galliwasp

References 

Comptus
Lizard genera
Lizards of the Caribbean